Nocturne was an industrial rock band formed in 1995 in Dallas, Texas. The band's core members were Lacey Sculls and Chris Telkes, and several touring musicians, usually Ben Graves of the Murderdolls and "Rotten" Rotny also guitar player of the industrial/metal band Psyclon Nine.

Band members
 Lacey Sculls (Vocals, Songwriting)
 Chris Telkes (Guitar, Programming, Songwriting, Production)
 Rotny (Live Bass)

Discography

Twilight
Nocturne was originally picked up by Triple X records and Hollows Hill. Twilight, Nocturnes debut CD was a blend of dark wave and industrial music and received mixed reviews. After its release, they toured with Ministry, Genitorturers, Christian Death, Godhead, Switchblade Symphony, Ohgr, and even Marilyn Manson.

Track listing
Seeing Things
Dead Sea
Spookius Mortem
A Happy Death
Monarch
Hallucination
Pride Must Be Sacrficed [P.M.S.]
Sub-Mission
Underworld
Shock
Pyrrhic Victory
Embrace
Lament
They Come
Twilight's Madness

Welcome To Paradise
After heavy touring in support of Twilight, Nocturnes second album, "Welcome to Paradise" was released.  The band received a nomination for "Best Industrial Band" in the Dallas Observer.

Track listing
Happy
My Bitch
Head Trip
Dissolute
Vortex
Waiting for Anything
Sad
It Burns
Final Hour
If I Could Leave, I Would
Empty Inside
Flirt (Part 1)
Flirt (Part 2)

Paradise Wasted
In a breakaway move, Nocturne was signed onto Invisible Records/Underground, Inc. One year later, "Paradise Wasted" was released. This CD was one of two "filler CDs" to bridge the gap between "Welcome to Paradise" and "Guide to Extinction". Paradise Wasted was essentially Welcome To Paradise with a new cover, now remastered, with two new bonus songs added, "Whore", and "Digit."

Track listing
Happy
My Bitch
Whore
Head Trip
Dissolute
Vortex
Waiting for Anything
Digit
Sad
It Burns
Final Hour
If I Could Leave, I Would
Empty Inside
Flirt (Part 1)
Flirt (Part 2)

Axis of Evil: Mixes of Mass Destruction
After another year, Axis of Evil: Mixes of Mass Destruction was turned out in 2003, again, to pass the time for the band, working forward for its third album. Axis of Evil was more limited in its edition, now out of print. Axis was a remix album of Paradise Wasted. The entire CD consisted of only 13 songs, but included a grand total of five versions of "Whore" and two versions of "My Bitch."

Track listing
Happy [Bile Meets the Inbred Brothers Free Hat Pull the Plug Mix]
My Bitch [Joolz Mix]
Whore [the Big Fat Whore on Dope Remix]
Dissolute [Etulossid Murder]
Happy [Mattress Factory Mix]
Whore [Hate Dept Mix]
Dissolution [Torrent Vaccine Mix]
My Bitch [All Fours Mix]
Happy [in the Flesh Mix]
Whore [Whorrific Mix]
Whore [Dkay.com Remix]
Whore [Whoreniest Show on Earth Remix]
Waiting for Anything [Everything Now Mix]

Guide to Extinction

For this album the band returned to their roots by signing back with Triple X Records. The CD was finally released in 2005, shortly after the break-up of the romantic relationship between Chris Telkes and Lacey Sculls. The album was considered Nocturne's best showcase, and features a variety of tracks that hint at their past sound. The band did a few months of touring, and afterward broke up.

Track listing
Shallow
I Lie
Alibi
Passion
Walk Away
Indulge
Class War
Nothing
Dirty Sanchez
No Way Out
Dead Man
Cocaine Sex
They'll Never Find Your Body

Guest appearances
 "Anthems of Rust and Decay:A Tribute to Marilyn Manson" (performing Get Your Gunn)
 "Easy Listening..." (Lacey performing Closer To Heaven)
 "Dim View of the Future (Chris Telkes performing Emily's Humming Mix)
 "The Broken Machine: A Tribute to Nine Inch Nails" (performing Kinda, I Want To)
 Lacey was a contestant on VH1's reality show Rock of Love with Bret Michaels from the 80's rock band Poison. Several of her housemates criticized her for her tactics in trying to win and nicknamed her "The Devil". On the Rock of Love Reunion Show, Nocturne performed "Shallow" from the album Guide to Extinction''.

Tours

References

External links
 Official webpage for frontwoman Lacey Sculls
 A small interview with Lacey on various topics about the band
 Nocturne's discography page
 Nocturne's biography page
 Review on the Guide to Extinction album
 Page listing Nocturne's other contributions
 Nocturne's official website (archived)
 Nocturne's official MySpace

American industrial metal musical groups
American nu metal musical groups
Musical groups established in 1999
Underground, Inc. artists
1999 establishments in Texas